Fernando Alexis Nieve [knee-EH-veh] (born July 15, 1982) is a Venezuelan former right-handed professional baseball pitcher. He played in Major League Baseball (MLB) for the  Houston Astros and New York Mets and in Korea Baseball Organization (KBO) for the Doosan Bears.
Current Minor League Pitching Coach at Pittsburgh Pirates

Career

Houston Astros

Nieve was signed by the Houston Astros as an amateur free agent in 1999. After two seasons in the Venezuelan Summer League he came to the U.S. to play for the rookie league Martinsville Astros. He was a Texas League all-star in 2005 with the Corpus Christi Hooks, when he was 4–2 with a 2.65 ERA in 14 starts. He made his major league debut with the Houston Astros on April 4, 2006 against the Florida Marlins. He made his first start on April 16 against the Arizona Diamondbacks and picked up his first win on May 2 against the Milwaukee Brewers. He was 3–3 in 40 appearances, 11 starts with the Astros in 2006, with  a 4.20 ERA. He missed the 2007 season with after undergoing Tommy John surgery and returned to appear in 11 games in 2008, all in relief and as 0–1 with an 8.44 ERA.

New York Mets
In March 2009, Nieve was claimed off waivers by the New York Mets and was called to the major league team in June when reliever J. J. Putz was placed on the disabled list.
In, 2010, due to his early workload, Mets' TV announcers began referring to him as "Nightly" Nieve.  
He was designated for assignment on July 23, 2010.
After he was let go by the Mets, he rejoined the organization and pitched in the Buffalo Bisons rotation.

Pittsburgh Pirates
On December 1, 2010, Nieve signed a minor league contract with the Pittsburgh Pirates, which included an invite to spring training. He was released by the Pirates on March 22, 2011.

Return to Astros
On March 24, 2011, Nieve signed a minor league contract with the Houston Astros. He was released a month later.

Doosan Bears
After being granted his release by the Astros on April 27, 2011, Nieve signed with the Doosan Bears in South Korea.

Los Angeles Dodgers
He signed a minor league contract with the Los Angeles Dodgers in December 2011. He was assigned to the AAA Albuquerque Isotopes. He made 25 starts for the Isotopes and was 7-9 with a 5.96 ERA.

Cleveland Indians
Nieve was a non-roster invitee to the Indians' spring training camp in 2013. His contract was purchased by the Indians on April 21, 2013. He was designated for assignment the next day without making an appearance.

Oakland Athletics
Nieve was traded to the Oakland Athletics for cash considerations on August 3, 2013. He was assigned to the AAA Sacramento River Cats. He became a free agent on October 1. He re-signed on November 18, 2013.

Los Angeles Angels of Anaheim
On June 13, 2014, Nieve signed a minor league deal with the Angels.

Sugar Land Skeeters
Nieve signed with the Sugar Land Skeeters for the 2015 season.

Guerreros de Oaxaca
On April 10, 2016, Nieve signed with the Guerreros de Oaxaca of the Mexican Baseball League. He was released on September 23, 2016.

Rojos del Águila de Veracruz
On April 11, 2017, Nieve signed with the Rojos del Águila de Veracruz of the Mexican Baseball League. He was released on June 24, 2017.

Generales de Durango
On July 11, 2017, Nieve signed with the Generales de Durango of the Mexican Baseball League.

T&A San Marino
On August 10, 2017, Nieve signed with the T&A San Marino of the Italian Baseball League.

Tecolotes de los Dos Laredos
On July 2, 2018, Nieve signed with the Tecolotes de los Dos Laredos of the Mexican League. He was released on August 13, 2018.

Coaching career
Nieve retired and became the pitching coach of the GCL Pirates for the 2019 season.

See also
 List of Major League Baseball players from Venezuela

References

External links

1982 births
Living people
Albuquerque Isotopes players
Binghamton Mets players
Bravos de Margarita players
Buffalo Bisons (minor league) players
Caribes de Anzoátegui players
Columbus Clippers players
Corpus Christi Hooks players
Doosan Bears players
Generales de Durango players
Guerreros de Oaxaca players
Houston Astros players
KBO League pitchers
Leones del Caracas players
Lexington Legends players
Major League Baseball pitchers
Major League Baseball players from Venezuela
Martinsville Astros players
Mexican League baseball pitchers
Navegantes del Magallanes players
New York Mets players
Oklahoma City RedHawks players
People from Puerto Cabello
Piratas de Campeche players
Rojos del Águila de Veracruz players
Round Rock Express players
Sacramento River Cats players
Salem Avalanche players
Salt Lake Bees players
Southern Maryland Blue Crabs players
T & A San Marino players
Tecolotes de los Dos Laredos players
Sugar Land Skeeters players
Venezuela national baseball team players
Venezuelan expatriate baseball players in Mexico
Venezuelan expatriate baseball players in South Korea
Venezuelan expatriate baseball players in the United States
Venezuelan expatriate baseball players in San Marino
Venezuelan Summer League La Pradera players
2015 WBSC Premier12 players